The IAI Harpy NG or IAI Harpy New Generation is a Loitering munition produced by the Israel Aerospace Industries. It is an anti-radiation drone and loitering weapon and is optimized for the SEAD operations. It has high explosive warhead and is a "fire and forget" autonomous weapon.

It can operate in all-weather day/night and it can be launched from a ground vehicle. It has 9 hours airborne time. Harpy improved in several ways from its predecessor, particularly in loiter time, range, altitude, maintenance and training. Also, it improved RF spectrum from 2–18 to 0.8–18 GHz.

References 

Harop
Harop
Canard aircraft
Delta-wing aircraft
Single-engined pusher aircraft
Wankel-engined aircraft
Tailless delta-wing aircraft